Eti Livni (born 1 June 1948) is a former Israeli politician who served as a member of the Knesset for Shinui and the Secular Faction between 2003 and 2006.

Biography
In the 1999 elections Livni was placed tenth on the Shinui list, but missed out on a seat when they won only six mandates. For the 2003 elections she was placed 12th on the party's list, and entered the Knesset when the party won 15 seats. During her first term, she chaired the Committee on the Status of Women and was a Deputy Speaker of the Knesset.

Along with most of the party's MKs, she defected to the Secular Faction (which later became Hetz) shortly before the 2006 elections following disagreements over the results of Shinui's primary results. She was placed sixth on the Hetz list for the elections, but lost her seat when the party failed to cross the electoral threshold.

In 2008 it was announced that Livni would run for a spot on the Kadima list for the 2009 elections. Ultimately she was placed 51st on the party's list, failing to win a seat.

References

External links

1948 births
Living people
People from Tel Aviv
Israeli Jews
Israeli lawyers
Women members of the Knesset
Hetz (political party) politicians
Shinui politicians
Israeli women lawyers
Members of the 16th Knesset (2003–2006)
Deputy Speakers of the Knesset
21st-century Israeli women politicians